Douglas Martin Adkins (born October 3, 1963) is an Americana/country musician and songwriter who grew up in Montana, United States.

In 2020 Adkins chose Samu Haber and Rea Garvey, the coaches from Team Samu Rea for the anniversary of The Voice of Germany (season 10). For the blind audition, Adkins sang the classic country hit "Achy Breaky Heart" by Billy Ray Cyrus. Coach Mark Forster also turned around for Adkins, but in the end Adkins chose Haber and Garvey due to the country music elements they have in their songwriting.

In the Battles, Adkins sang against newcomer Claudia Pahl from Tirol, Austria. Together they performed the Billie Eilish hit "Ocean Eyes". The duet performed the song in a country music style, which garnered worldwide attention and hundreds of thousands of views on The Voice of Germany website. It received acclaim for its originality and daring approach.

Between 1990 and 2020, Adkins recorded 10 original studio CDs. In 2005 he worked with Nashville producer and bass player Mike Chapman to bring about the CD Whiskey Salesman. Chapman is known as one of the "G-Men" credited with recording the music on every Garth Brooks album. Also appearing on those first successful recordings were Brent Mason and J.T. Corenflos on electric and acoustic guitars; Paul Franklin and Bruce Bouton on steel guitar, lap steel and dobro; and Lonnie Wilson on drums.

The first track released from the CD Whiskey Salesman stayed at the #1 position on the European Hotdisc Top 40 Country Charts for the weeks of 23 February and 2 March 2006. "Whiskey Salesman" was nominated for "Best Country Song of the Year" in 2008 by the Independent Music Awards. The second song released off the Whiskey Salesman CD was "Window Shoppin", which reached the #12 position on the European Hotdisc Top 40 Country Charts.

Life and career 

Adkins was born in Havre, Montana, the son of Marilyn and Jack Adkins. His father was an educator and basketball coach in Northeast Montana. Growing up in Montana, Doug lived in Westby, Culbertson, and Froid, and graduated high school from Sidney, Montana in 1982. He grew up singing with his sisters Jaclyn, Betty Jo, Theresa and Joan.

Adkins played basketball and golf in high school. He played the trombone, and for four years in a row received a #1 mark at the state level for performing solo.

Songwriter 

As a songwriter, Adkins has written 250 songs and recorded ten CDs. His greatest success came when he recorded the Whiskey Salesman sessions in Nashville with producer Mike Chapman. With the song "Whiskey Salesman", Adkins won the 2008 Independent Country Music Award for Top Single. Also from the same recording sessions came the song "Window Shoppin'", which brought Adkins popularity across Europe and the United States, giving him respect among country songwriters.

Adkins tours regularly in Europe, with occasional tours through the U.S. He has performed in the United States, Switzerland, France, Austria, Belgium, Germany, Poland, Italy, Latvia, Lithuania, Spain, Italy, the Netherlands, Denmark, Sweden, and Norway.

Awards and recognition 

 23 February 2006 - Song "Whiskey Salesman" reached #1 on the European Country Hotdisc Charts and stayed at the #1 position for four consecutive weeks.
 22 June 2006 - Song "Window Shoppin'" reached #12 on the European Country Hotdisc Charts.
 2008 - Adkins was nominated for "Best Country Song of the Year" with his song "Whiskey Salesman" by the Independent Music Awards.
 3 October 2010 - "Song Yippee ii Yippee aa'" reached #14 on the European Country Hotdisc Top 40 Charts.
 28 November 2010- Song "Ain't Gonna Play With Your Heart" reached #14, spending 3 months from November 10, 2010 to January 30, 2011 on the European Country Hotdisc Top 40 Charts.
 3 April 2011 - Song "Loved You More'" reached #11 on the European Country Hotdisc Top 40 Charts.
 14 September 2014 - Song "Pretty Girls", recorded by Adkins and Barry P. Foley, reaches #2 on the European Country Hotdisc Top 40 Charts.
 1 August 2020 - Selected Samu Haber and Rea Garvey from Team Samu Rea for the anniversary of The Voice of Germany (season 10).
 1 October 2020 - Adkins sang the classic country hit "Achy Breaky Heart" by Billy Ray Cyrus.
 1 November 2020 - In the Battles for The Voice of Germany Adkins and Claudia Pahl performed the Billie Eilish hit "Ocean Eyes".

Discography

Albums 
1990 Just Livin
1993 Habits and Hearts
1995 Cowboy Comes Alive
1998 Time Keeps Movin On
2002 A Losin' Soul
2005 Whiskey Salesman
2007 One More Mile To Go
2010 Waltz Across Montana
2016 Lonesome
2018 Dirt Roads and Fence Lines
2022 A Cowboys' Life

References

External links 

Living people
American male musicians
American country musicians
American country singer-songwriters
The Voice of Germany
1963 births
Musicians from Montana
People from Havre, Montana
Country musicians from Montana
American male singer-songwriters